Tongren Fenghuang Airport  is an airport serving the city of Tongren in Guizhou Province, China.  It is located in Daxing Subdistrict in Songtao Miao Autonomous County, 21 kilometers from Tongren and 34 kilometers from Fenghuang, a popular tourist destination in neighboring Hunan Province. The airport was opened in 2001. Originally called Tongren Daxing Airport, it was renamed in October 2009.

Accidents
On 5 January 1960, a fire broke out at the Tongren Airport (under-construction), killing 175 and injured 5. This is the deadliest airport fire in China.

Airlines and destinations

See also
List of airports in China
List of the busiest airports in China

References

Airports in Guizhou
Airports established in 2001
2001 establishments in China